The 2021–22 Club América season is the club's 77th consecutive season in the top-flight of Mexican football. The team will participate in the Liga MX.

Coaching staff

Source: Club América

Players

Squad information 

Players and squad numbers last updated on 26 January 2022.Note: Flags indicate national team as has been defined under FIFA eligibility rules. Players may hold more than one non-FIFA nationality.

Transfers

Summer

In

Out

Winter

In

Out

Pre-season and friendlies
Club América preceded their 2021–22 campaign by taking part in the "Tour Águila" in the United States, and mid-season friendlies against Guadalajara and Pumas UNAM.

Competitions

Overview

Liga MX

Apertura 2021

Results by round

Clausura 2022

Results by round

Apertura 2021

Matches

Regular phase

Liguilla

Quarter-finals

Clausura 2022

Matches

Regular phase

Liguilla

Quarter-finals

Semi-finals

2021 CONCACAF Champions League 

The 2021 CONCACAF Champions League began during the 2020–21 Liga MX season.

Round of 16 
The round of 16 was played during the 2020–21 season.

Quarter-finals 
The quarter-final was played during the 2020–21 season.

Semi-finals

Final

References 

Club América seasons
2021 in Mexican sports